Husavik is a village in Austevoll municipality in Vestland county, Norway. The village is a regular stop for a ferry service connecting the islands of Austevoll to the large island of Stord to the south, across the Selbjørnsfjorden. The village was one of the first villages in Austevoll to gain industrial jobs. An engine factory was built here in 1910.

References

Villages in Vestland
Austevoll